The Men's Team normal hill/4 x 5 km at the FIS Nordic World Ski Championships 2011 was held on 28 February 2011. The ski jumping part of this event took place at 11:30 CET while the cross country part of the event took place at 15:00 CET. This event replaced the 10 km mass start event held at the previous world championships that was won by Todd Lodwick of the United States.

Ski Jumping

Cross-Country

References

FIS Nordic World Ski Championships 2011